Xinfu District, is one of the four districts under the administration of the city of Fushun, Liaoning Province, China.

Administrative divisions
There are six subdistricts within the district.

Subdistricts:
Zhanqian Subdistrict, Fumin Subdistrict, Xinfu Subdistrict, Yong'antai Subdistrict, Donggongyuan Subdistrict, Yulin Subdistrict

References

External links

Fushun
County-level divisions of Liaoning
Districts of China